Mosta is a small but densely populated city in the Northern Region of Malta. The most prominent building in Mosta is the Rotunda, a large basilica built by its parishioners' volunteer labour. It features the world's 3rd largest unsupported dome, and displays a replica of a German bombshell that famously crashed through the dome but did not detonate upon impact.

Mosta celebrates the parish feast of the Assumption every 15 August. Mosta's feast day celebration is popular amongst both locals and tourists. The city is annually decorated by local parishioners and townspeople, seeking to demonstrate their affection for the city and its patron saint, weeks ahead of the public procession.

General

History 
Mosta has been inhabited since pre-history. Dolmens in the limits of Mosta and cart ruts are primary evidence of this. Each dolmen has two rectangular standing stones and one other similar stone positioned horizontally above the other two.

In the Middle Ages, Mosta was a small hamlet amongst a number of other hamlets, each sparsely populated. These tiny villages were Raħal Calleja, Raħal Ħobla, Raħal Pessa or Pise, Raħal Sir, Raħal Kircipulli, Raħal Brabar and Raħal Dimech. In the 16th century, these hamlets decreased in importance and Mosta took its place as the principal village. The Apostolic Visit of Mgr Pietro Dusina in 1575 indicated that even the church dedicated to the Assumption that stood in Mosta was so important in the area that it was erroneously called ‘parochial church’. In 1575, there were 580 persons living in Mosta.

Mosta is, in contemporary times, witnessing the construction of many new houses. New built-up zones with residential houses are found on the outskirts of older Mosta. These new zones are known as: Santa Margerita, Tal-Blata l-Għolja, Iż-Żokrija, Is-Sgħajtar and Ta’ Mlit. This means that the population of Mosta is increasing. Mosta has also become a bustling commercial centre. All these developments have made Mosta a big town by local standards and it is today amongst the largest in the Maltese Islands.

Transportation 
As Mosta is at the centre of Malta; buses pass through Mosta on the way to Buġibba, Burmarrad, St. Paul's Bay, Qawra, Xemxija, Mġarr, Ċirkewwa and Mellieħa.

Legends 
The town has several legends such as The Bride of Mosta build by the famous mostareur
 a french architect (L-Għarusa tal-Mosta).

Social Groups 
Mosta has its own scouts and girl guides, two band clubs (Nicolo' Isouard and Santa Marija), and two fireworks factories. A lot of traffic passes through Constitution Street, one of Mosta's main streets, connecting the south to the north.

Places of interest

Sanctuary Basilica of the Assumption of Our Lady (also known as the Rotunda of Mosta or the Mosta Dome) 

Mosta boasts the third largest unsupported dome in the world. The church, also commonly known as the Rotunda of Mosta or the Mosta Dome, is dedicated to the Assumption. The Feast of the Assumption is held on 15 August and it is a public holiday in Malta.

From its inception as a parish in 1608, Mosta has had three different churches built on the same site, with the current one being designed by Giorgio Grognet de Vassé, a French resident of Mosta. The Mostin at that time, totalling not more than 1500, built the church.

Grognet’s design was based on that of the Pantheon of Rome. Due to debates and doubts regarding the design, the first stone was laid on 30 May 1833. The rotunda has a diameter of 55.20 metres on the outside and 39.60 metres on the inside. The main façade faces south and has six columns in the Ionic style. On each side, a steeple rises from the façade. Following the front elevation, the church has an analogous style at the back, but without steeples. The dome was built on the principle of the catenary profile, meaning that each stone was laid over the one underneath it.

The church took 27 years to complete and became a major attraction. On 9 April 1942, the church was nearly destroyed during World War II. An Axis bomb hit the dome of the church whilst people were inside, but it failed to explode. The detonator was removed and a replica bomb is now displayed as a memorial.

Lion monument in Rotunda Square 
A prominent feature of Rotunda Square is a statue of a lion on a pedestal. Once, this was part of a fountain which originally was in Sliema. The fountain has since been removed. The statue is made of bronze-coloured cast iron. It was made in the Val d’Osne Foundry in Paris. Embossed on the pedestal there are the coat-of-arms of Mosta and those of independent Malta.

Ta' Bistra Catacombs 
The Ta' Bistra Catacombs are the largest set of catacombs found to date outside Rabat, and are located in Triq il-Missjunarji Maltin in Mosta. These catacombs were first recorded in the 1800s but were only investigated in 1933 by Captain Charles Zammit, before part of the site was covered over by a new road leading down to Burmarrad. Further studies in 2004, 2013, and 2014, have brought the site back to life with new discoveries. This site has been part of three EU-funded projects and is now managed by Heritage Malta.

Speranza Chapel (Chapel of Our Lady of Hope)
An attraction in Mosta is the Speranza Chapel in the Speranza Valley. The chapel was built between 1760 and 1761. A legend tied to the Chapel recounts that, during a Turkish invasion, a young girl and her sisters taking care of their family's sheep were at risk to be taken by the invaders. Whilst the sisters escaped, the young girl could not run fast enough because she limped slightly. It is said that she hid in a cave found under the chapel's left side. Meanwhile, she prayed to Mary, promising that if she were saved, she would build a chapel dedicated to Our Lady. When the Turkish invaders chasing her arrived, they didn't look for her in the cave because they thought the girl could not be hiding there as there was an intact web at the entrance, which would have been damaged had she entered the cave.

Marquis Mallia Tabone Farmhouse
The Marquis Mallia Tabone Farmhouse is a folklore attraction run by the Talent Mosti philanthropy in collaboration with the adjacent school's council. The farmhouse overlooks the valley of Wied il-Għasel. It houses exhibitions varying from paintings, photography, artisan work, hobbies and a permanent folklore museum.

Wied Filep Dolmens 
Two dolmens, dating back to the Bronze Age, can be seen in a field between Vjal Ragusa and Dawret il-Wied.

Cumbo Tower
The Cumbo Tower is a fortified residence in Mosta. In the grounds there is a small Christian family tomb from the Roman era.

Other sites of interest

Tal-Għammariet Hypogeum 
This is a site that has most likely been destroyed, and has been recorded by Emmanuel Magri as being in the hamlet of Ħal Dimech, now part of Mosta, and not far from the Ta' Bistra Catacombs.

Fort Mosta Catacomb 
Within the grounds of Fort Mosta, there is a small catacomb. Originally, this was a Punic shaft tomb but it was enlarged into a Roman period catacomb complete with an agape table. This site is within the confines of Fort Mosta which is used by the Armed Forces of Malta.

Wied il-Għasel Catacomb 
Another small catacomb is found in Wied il-Għasel, consisting of a series of seven tombs dug in the rock in a semi-circular form found in the side of a natural cave beneath Fort Mosta.

Alleged Roman Temple site 
In a 2008 publication, then Mosta Mayor Dr Paul Chetcuti Caruana stated: "As many know, and no one knows, in the neighbourhood of Ta’ Bistra there is at least one Roman temple which has been buried by the speculators."

Zones in Mosta 
 Beżbiżija
 Blata l-Għolja
 Folju
 il-Ħanqa
 Mosta Technopark
 Mount Saint Joseph
 San Ġużepp tat-Tarġa
 San Pawl Eremita
 San Pawl tal-Qlejgħa
 San Silvestru
 Santa Margerita
 Sgħajtar
 L-Isperanza
 Ta' Bistra
 Ta' Maċedonja
 Ta' Mlit
 Ta' Redusa
 Ta' Srajgu
 Ta' Xkora
 Tal-Awrora
 Taċ-Ċawla
 Tad-Daqqaq
 Tad-Dib
 Tal-Ħanżira
 Tal-Qares
 Tal-Wata
 Tal-Wej
 Tas-Sriedek
 Tat-Torba
 Taż-Żokrija
 Tarġa Gap
 Wied Ġjananu
 Wied il-Għasel

Twin cities 
Mosta has three sister cities:
  Millbrae, California, United States (since April 1996) 
  Ragusa, Italy
  Cassagnabère-Tournas, France

References

External links 

 Mosta Local Council Website
 Panoramic View of Mosta @ Places of Interest
 Harsien Patrimonju Mosti Website

 
Towns in Malta
Local councils of Malta